A side hustle, or side job, is an additional job that a person takes to supplement their income.

Side hustle may also refer to:

 Side Hustle, an American television series
 Side Hustles, a 2002 album by UGK
 "Side Hustle", a 2019 single by Peabod